(born 8 September 1994) is a Japanese speed skater.

Kondo competed at the 2014 Winter Olympics for Japan. In the 1000 metres he finished 35th overall and in the 1500 metres he finished 31st.

Kondo won a bronze medal at the 2014 World Junior Speed Skating Championships, in the 1000 m.

Kondo made his World Cup debut in December 2012. As of September 2014, Kondo's best World Cup finish is 4th in a 1000 m B race at the World Cup stop in Nagano in 2012–13. His best overall finish in the World Cup is 41st, in the 1500 metres in 2012–13.

References 

1994 births
Japanese male speed skaters
Speed skaters at the 2014 Winter Olympics
Olympic speed skaters of Japan
Speed skaters at the 2011 Asian Winter Games
Speed skaters at the 2017 Asian Winter Games
Medalists at the 2017 Asian Winter Games
Asian Games medalists in speed skating
Asian Games bronze medalists for Japan
People from Kitami, Hokkaido
Living people
21st-century Japanese people